Hoplophanes chalcophaedra is a moth of the family Heliozelidae. It was described by Alfred Jefferis Turner in 1923. It is found in New South Wales.

References

Moths described in 1923
Heliozelidae